The Australian Defence Force Basketball Association (ADFBA) formed in 1983, is an accredited Australian Defence Force sporting association under the auspices of the Australian Defence Force Sports Council (ADFSC).

ADF Combined Service National Championships

ADFBA National Teams

Awards

Most Valuable Players 
The Bob Croxton Trophy is awarded to the women's MVP and the Brian Egan Trophy to the men's MVP.

Player's Player Award 
Award voted on by the players in recognition of an admired competitor.
Female's Player's Player is awarded the Donna Puglisi Trophy.
Male's Player's Player is awarded the Chris Siegmann Trophy.

Rookie of the Year Award 
Award given to the best player in their first year.

Champion Point Scorers 
Awarded to players who tally highest points total during championships. The men's champion is awarded the Bob Shortridge Trophy.
The point scoring titles ceased to be awarded after 2009.

Champion Three Point Shooters 
Three point contest held traditionally as interval between the Men's & Women's Finals Games, hosted by the Brotherhood and Sisterhood.

Major Greg "Frenchie" McDougall Award 
Awarded to the person who demonstrates the energy, indomitable spirit, sense of fair play and enjoyment of life that the late Major Gregory John "Frenchie" McDougall displayed both on and off the court.

Administration 
Australian Defence Force Basketball Association is administered by the ADBA committee and is responsible to the Australian Defence Sports Council (ADSC). The ADFBA was originally formed in 1983. The first committee was established by six members. LEUT Bruce Fallon (Navy), Will Van Weedenberg (Army), MAJ Adrian Corkeron (Army), WGCDR Bob Shortridge (Air Force), SQNLDR Amanda Leslie (Air Force), and FSGT John Nordheim (Air Force).

The 2010 National Championships was disbanded following an investigation into the conduct of the 2009 Championships.

ADFBA Official Logo 

The first ADFBA logo was designed during the 1999 Arafura Games by a committee of those attending the Games.

The ADF Sports Council recommended that the word 'Force' be removed from ADF Sports Associations. A re-branded logo as the 'ADBA' was designed by Kellie Davis and approved by the ADBA Committee meeting held at RAAF Fairbairn, Canberra ACT in 2012.

The ADFSC later retraced this decision and a refreshed ADFBA logo based on the original 1999 design was reinstalled.

See also 

 Australian Defence Force
 Basketball Australia
 International Basketball Federation

Sources 
Australian Defence Basketball Association (ADBA)

External links

Australian Defence Basketball Association (ADBA)
South Australian Defence Basketball (SADB)
Navy Basketball
Department of Defence
Defence Jobs
Fédération Internationale de Basketball (FIBA)
Basketball Australia
WNBL Championship

References

Basketball governing bodies in Australia
Sports organizations established in 1983
Military sports governing bodies
Australian Defence Force
Basketball